Low Reef is a reef extending for  from the east end of Annenkov Island, which lies off South Georgia in the South Atlantic. The name "Low Rock" appeared on a 1931 Admiralty chart for the northeastern rock of this reef. The South Georgia Survey, 1956–57, reported that it was the reef which required a name to distinguish it from nearby Hauge Reef.

References

Reefs of Antarctica
Geography of South Georgia and the South Sandwich Islands